The 2010 IAAF World Indoor Championships in Athletics was held between 12 and 14 March at the Aspire Dome in Doha, Qatar. The championships was the first of six IAAF World Athletics Series events to take place in 2010.

Bidding and organisation
The IAAF announced on March 25, 2007, at an IAAF Council meeting in Mombasa, Kenya that it had received bids from Turkey and Qatar to host the championships. On November 25, in a Council meeting in Monaco, the IAAF announced that Doha would host the championships. This was the first time that a world athletics championship was held in the Middle-East and the second time the World Indoor Championships was held outside of Europe or North America (after the 1999 Championships in Japan).

The venue for the event was the indoor arena located within Doha's Aspire Zone – the ASPIRE Dome, which has previously hosted indoor athletics for the 2008 Asian Indoor Athletics Championships. The World Indoor Championships was the first of two significant athletics events to take place in Doha in 2010 – the inaugural 2010 IAAF Diamond League will begin with the Qatar Athletic Super Grand Prix meeting in May.

Prior to the championships, the Qatar organising committee held the Doha Indoor Athletics Meeting for Juniors as a test event for the venue. The meeting began on 26 February and featured junior athletes from 11 countries within the region competing in a total of 13 events.

The competition set a new high for the number of nations at the World Indoor Championships: 150 countries sent teams to the championships, with a total of 374 men and 283 women athletes entered to compete.

The competition mascot was an anthropomorphic caracal named Saham – the caracal is a medium-sized cat which is native to the Middle-East. The inclusion of a mascot follows on from the mainstream success of the 2009 World Championships in Athletics mascot – Berlino the Bear.

The IAAF extended live audio and video coverage of the championships to the internet for certain countries, including a deal with IEC in Sports which saw events available live and on-demand via Dailymotion. This was the first deal of its kind for the competition.

Drug tests
Anna Alminova, a Russian athlete who competed in the 1500 m failed a drug test while at the championships. She tested positive for pseudoephedrine, which was present in a cold medicine she was taking, and received a three-month ban.

Schedule

All dates are AST (UTC+3)

Results

Men
2006 | 2008 | 2010 | 2012 | 2014

Women
2006 | 2008 | 2010 | 2012 | 2014

Medal table

Participating nations

 (2)
 (1)
 (1)
 (1)
 (1)
 (6)
 (3)
 (2)
 (13)
 (10)
 (1)
 (2)
 (9)
 (8)
 (9)
 (1)
 (7)
 (1)
 (6)
 (1)
 (1)
 (15)
 (1)
 (1)
 (1)
 (1)
 (1)
 (13)
 (2)
 (17)
 (1)
 (5)
 (1)
 (1)
 (1)
 (14)
 (3)
 (8)
 (2)
 (24)
 (1)
 (1)
 (30)
 (1)
 (13)
 (1)
 (7)
 (1)
 (1)
 (1)
 (1)
 (1)
 (3)
 (1)
 (1)
 (1)
 (1)
 (8)
 (1)
 (13)
 (1)
 (6)
 (8)
 (1)
 (1)
 (1)
 (3)
 (1)
 (2)
 (1)
 (2)
 (5)
 (1)
 (1)
 (5)
 (1)
 (1)
 (1)
 (1)
 (1)
 (1)
 (1)
 (1)
 (3)
 (1)
 (1)
 (1)
 (1)
 (4)
 (1)
 (2)
 (1)
 (1)
 (1)
 (1)
 (1)
 (1)
 (1)
 (1)
 (15)
 (5)
 (1)
 (6)
 (3)
 (5)
 (42)
 (1)
 (1)
 (1)
 (1)
 (2)
 (1)
 (2)
 (2)
 (1)
 (3)
 (1)
 (1)
 (4)
 (3)
 (2)
 (8)
 (1)
 (1)
 (1)
 (1)
 (1)
 (1)
 (1)
 (1)
 (1)
 (3)
 (3)
 (1)
 (18)
 (51)
 (3)
 (1)
 (1)
 (1)
 (1)
 (1)
 (1)

References

External links

Official site
Doha 2010 Statistics Handbook - Part One
Doha 2010 Statistics Handbook - Part Two

 
World Indoor
IAAF World Indoor Championships
World Athletics Indoor Championships
Sports competitions in Doha
International athletics competitions hosted by Qatar
21st century in Doha
March 2010 sports events in Asia